"The First Nowell", also known as "The First Noel (or Noël)", is a traditional English Christmas carol with Cornish origins, most likely from the early modern period, although possibly earlier. It is listed as number 682 in the Roud Folk Song Index.

Origin
"The First Nowell" is of Cornish origin. Its current form was first published in Carols Ancient and Modern (1823) and Gilbert and Sandys Carols (1833), both of which were edited by William Sandys and arranged and edited by Davies Gilbert (who also wrote extra lyrics) for Hymns and Carols of God.

Nowell is an Early Modern English synonym of "Christmas" from French Noël "the Christmas season", ultimately from Latin natalis [dies] "[day] of birth". The word was regularly used in the burden of carols in the Middle Ages towards the early modern period; Sir Christèmas (Ritson Manuscript), "Nowell sing we now all and some" (Trinity Carol Roll) and "Nowel - out of youre slepe arise and wake" (Selden Carol Book) being 15th century examples.

The melody is unusual among English folk melodies in that it consists of one musical phrase repeated twice, followed by a refrain which is a variation on that phrase. All three phrases end on the third of the scale. Writing in the Journal of the Folk-Song Society in 1915, Anne Gilchrist notes it was not recorded prior to Sandys' publication. She speculated based on a set of church gallery parts discovered in Westmorland that the tune may have had its origin as a treble part to another carol "Hark, hark what news the angels bring"; her suggestion was that the treble part was passed down orally and was later remembered as the melody rather than a harmony. A conjectural reconstruction of this earlier version can be found in the New Oxford Book of Carols.

Today, "The First Nowell" is usually performed in a four-part hymn arrangement by the English composer John Stainer, first published in his Carols, New and Old in 1871.  Variations of its theme are included in Victor Hely-Hutchinson's Carol Symphony.

American folklorist James Madison Carpenter made audio recordings of several traditional versions of the song in Cornwall in the early 1930s, which can be heard online via the Vaughan Williams Memorial Library.

Textual comparison
In common with many traditional songs and carols the lyrics vary across books. The versions compared below are taken from the New English Hymnal (1986) (which is the version used in Henry Ramsden Bramley and John Stainer's Carols, New and Old), Ralph Dunstan's gallery version in the Cornish Songbook (1929) and Reverend Charles Lewis Hutchins's version in Carols Old and Carols New (1916).

The Annunciation to the shepherds and the Adoration of the shepherds are episodes in the Nativity of Jesus described in the second chapter of the Gospel of Luke (Luke 2). The Star of Bethlehem appears in the story of the Magi (the Wise Men) in the Gospel of Matthew; it does not appear in the story of the shepherds.

Charts

Mariah Carey version

Whitney Houston version

Weekly charts

Year-end charts

Glee Cast version

Gabby Barrett version

TobyMac and Owl City version

See also
 List of Christmas carols

References

External links

 Free arrangements for piano and voice from Cantorion.org

Christmas carols
Cornish folk songs
Crash Test Dummies songs
Bob Dylan songs
Elvis Presley songs
Songs about Jesus
Aly & AJ songs